Martin Cooke may refer to:

Martin Cooke (baritone), opera singer
Martin Cooke (mayor), mayor of Hoboken, New Jersey, 1912–1915

See also
Marty Cook (born 1947), American jazz trombonist